The 2011 IIHF InLine Hockey World Championship was the 16th IIHF InLine Hockey World Championship, the premier annual international inline hockey tournament. It took place between 19 and 25 June in the Czech Republic. The games were played in the ČEZ Arena in Pardubice.

Venue

Nations
The following eight nations qualified for the elite-pool tournament. Six nations from Europe, and two nations from North America were represented.

Europe

North America

Seeding and groups

The seeding in the preliminary round was based on the final standings at the 2010 IIHF InLine Hockey World Championship and 2010 IIHF InLine Hockey World Championship Division I. The teams were grouped accordingly by seeding at the previous year's tournament (in parenthesis is the corresponding seeding):

Group A
 (1)
 (4)
 (5)
 (8)

Group B
 (2)
 (3)
 (6)
 (7)

Preliminary round
Eight participating teams were placed in the following two groups. After playing a round-robin, every team advanced to the Playoff round.

Group A

All times are local (UTC+2).

Group B

All times are local (UTC+2).

Playoff round

Quarterfinals
All times are local (UTC+2).

Placement round
All times are local (UTC+2).

Semifinals
All times are local (UTC+2).

Relegation round
Time is local (UTC+2).

Bronze medal game
Time is local (UTC+2).

Gold medal match
Time is local (UTC+2).

Ranking and statistics

Tournament Awards
Best players selected by the directorate:
Best Goalkeeper: 
Best Defenseman: 
Best Forward:

Final standings
The final standings of the tournament according to IIHF:

Scoring leaders
List shows the top skaters sorted by points, then goals. If the list exceeds 10 skaters because of a tie in points, all of the tied skaters are shown.
GP = Games played; G = Goals; A = Assists; Pts = Points; +/− = Plus/minus; PIM = Penalties in minutes; POS = PositionSource: IIHF.com

Leading goaltenders
Only the top five goaltenders, based on save percentage, who have played 40% of their team's minutes are included in this list.
TOI = Time on ice (minutes:seconds); SA = Shots against; GA = Goals against; GAA = Goals against average; Sv% = Save percentage; SO = Shutouts.Source: IIHF.com

See also
2011 IIHF InLine Hockey World Championship Division I

References

External links

IIHF InLine Hockey World Championship
IIHF InLine Hockey World Championship
IIHF InLine Hockey World Championship
2011 in inline hockey
Sports competitions in Pardubice
Inline hockey in the Czech Republic